Sir John William Anderson, 1st Baronet (ca. 173621 May 1813) was a British politician.

Born in Danzig, he was the son of William Anderson and Lucy Sheldon who had settled in that town. Anderson was an alderman of Aldersgate between 1789 and 1813 and Sheriff of London between 1791 and 1792. He was a Member of Parliament (MP) for London from 1793 to 1806. Between 1797 and 1798, Anderson was Lord Mayor of London. On 14 May 1798, he was made a baronet, of Mill Hill, Hendon, in the County of Middlesex.

In 1762, he married Dorothy Simkins, daughter of Charles Simkins. Their marriage was childless. Anderson died in May 1813 and the baronetcy became extinct.

Involvement in slave trade

John, with his brother Alexander, owned a slave factory on Bance Island. Their business was based in Philpot Lane, Eastcheap. John was active politically to prevent any restrictions in the running of the slave trade, for example working with his brother to organise a petition to the House of Lords in 1799. John was also an investor in the West India Dock Company. He was a director of the company from 1803 until his death.

References

External links

1730s births
1813 deaths
Baronets in the Baronetage of Great Britain
Sheriffs of the City of London
18th-century lord mayors of London
18th-century English politicians
19th-century English politicians
Members of the Parliament of Great Britain for English constituencies
Members of the Parliament of the United Kingdom for English constituencies
British MPs 1790–1796
British MPs 1796–1800
UK MPs 1801–1802
UK MPs 1802–1806
Year of birth uncertain
British slave traders